Roskam is a Dutch surname and can refer to:

Arjan Roskam, Dutch Cannabis activist
Catherine S. Roskam (born 1943), American Episcopal bishop
Jan Roskam (born 1930), Dutch-American aerospace engineer
John Roskam, Australian  public policy think tank director
Mateo Roskam (born 1987), Croatian footballer
Michaël R. Roskam (born 1972), Belgian film director
Peter Roskam (born 1961), American (Illinois) Republican politician

See also
Roskam, Netherlands, a hamlet in Limburg

References

Dutch-language surnames